The Country Development Unit is a non-political and non-governmental organization in Afghanistan, established in early 1992 to participate in the rehabilitation and development of the war-torn country. It has registered with the MoP and is a member of the Afghan NGOs' Coordination Bureau .

Projects have been implemented with the collaboration of donors such as UNHCR, UNICEF, UNOPS, ADB, CIDA, CARE, Hummer Forum, IRC, JEN LBG/USAID and ICR.

The projects implemented comprised road rehabilitation, irrigation net works, clinic construction, return and IDP rapid assessment surveys, shelter, shallow well development, IGP (quilt making, stove production, carpentry training and production), school construction, and distribution of food and non-food items. Badakhshan, Logar, Kabul, Kapisa and Khost were covered by the projects.

CDU is involved with the Construction Vocational Training Projects such as Wooden Productive. Carpentry Training in Jabal Saraj, Parwan where 240 carpenters were trained in 2002 and now it is one of the CDU's ongoing projects on IG bases. CDU want to expand these kinds of training in Kabul as well as other provinces.

Mission
CDU is an Afghan non-governmental, humanitarian organization that supports sustainable development in Afghanistan through promoting the ability of local communities to decide upon and manage their own development process.

The aim is cooperation with civil society organizations, the private sector and governmental institutions, with an emphasis on poverty eradication, and assistance towards the return and re-integration of refugees and internally displaced people.

List of projects implemented:
 	Domanda-Khost Feeder Road 
 	Arram Kot Road
 	Rehabilitation of Shindand-Hirat Highway
 	Construction of Asmar-Kunar Road structures
 	Construction of Helipad
 	Earth works of Taluqan-Kishm Road

Building construction/renovation
 	52 Shelter in Lugar
 	Construction of 5 Community Center (schools)
 	Construction of Guard Rm for IRC in Shashdarak
 	Construction of auto workshop for IRC
 	300 shelter for returnees and IDPs
 	Refurbishment of Nomad School
 	Rehabilitation of Construction Dep (MoEd)
 	Floor Marbling of Construction Dep (MoEd)
 	1000 shelter for returnees and IDPs
 	Ebrahim Khil Clinic (BHC)
	Melan Clinic (BHC)
	Mamuzai Jani Khil Clinic (BHC)
	Arma Clinic (BHC)
	Surkai Clinic (BHC)
	Kolalgu Clinic (CHC)
 	Shwak Clinic (BHC)
 	Kohseen Clinic (BHC)
 	Dem Ghundi Mangal Clinic (BHC)
 	Mirzaka Mangal Clinic (BHC)
 	Tashnak Clinic (BHC)
 Jani Khil Clinic (CHC)
 	Dre Khuleh Clinic (BHC)
 	Ebrahim Khil Clinic (BHC)
 	Sajawand Clinic (BHC)
 	Shah Mazar Clinic (BHC)
 	Deh Dushanbe Clinics (BHC)
 	Mir Barakat Clinic (BHC)
 	Garmaba Clinic (CHC)
 	Burg Clinic (BHC)
 	Kharuti Clinic (BHC)
 	Khuja Angur Clinic (BHC)
 	Shikhan Clinic (BHC)
 	Roof Retrofit of 13 clinics in Paktya Province
 	Roof Retrofit of 8 clinics in Badakhshan Province
 	Roof Retrofit of 5 clinics in Ghazni (5 CHC)
 	Comp of remaining works of Khwar Qul (CHC)
 	Comp of remaining works of Jaka Pashi (CHC)
 	Comp of remaining works of Sangar (CHC)
 	Comp of remaining works of Turmai (CHC)
 	Comp of remaining works of Askar Kot (CHC)
 	Comp of remaining works of Bagh Sarkari (CHC)
 	Comp of remaining works of Babur (BHC)
 	Comp of remaining works of Meshan (CHC)
 	Comp of remaining works of Tulakan (BHC)
 	Comp of remaining works of Nahr Rubat (BHC)
 	Renovation of Baraki Hospital
 	Modification of Jaji Custom House
 	Construction of Black Horse project
 	Renovation of bathroom and shower facilities
 	Water Pump House in Ghazni and Gardiz
 	Refurbishment of 23 school and clinics
 	Renovation of KIMS Wardak (MRI Clinic)
 	Construction of Latrine and Bio Gas Digester
 	Construction of Yawan CHC
	Construction of annexes to Yawan CHC

Irrigation network
	Construction of Khairabad intake
	Rehabilitation of Karizes

Water supply and sanitation
	Shallow well construction
	Rural water sanitation and hygiene education
	Water Supply
	Water Supply and Sanitation for Schools

Vocational training
	Carpentry Training Center
	Production of 4500 quilts by women
	Production of 4000 coal stoves (apprenticeship Prog)
	Productive wood Work Training Center (IGP)
	Gilim weaving training and health education (female)
	Quilt Making Project for women

Distribution of relief goods
	Distribution of relief goods for returnees
	Distribution of school bags for students
	IDPs Rapid Assessment Survey
	Supply of school furniture (Durkhani GHS)
	Distribution of food and non-food items
	Distribution of food and non-food items
	Supply of door/window

Address
House # 88, Charrahi Haji Mohammad Dad, Taimani Road, Kabul-City, Afghanistan

References

Economy of Afghanistan
Non-profit organisations based in Afghanistan